Beatrice Covassi (born 1 December 1968) is an Italian politician who has been serving as a Member of the European Parliament for the Democratic Party since 2022.

References

See also 

 List of members of the European Parliament for Italy, 2019–2024

1968 births
Living people
21st-century Italian politicians
21st-century Italian women politicians
MEPs for Italy 2019–2024
21st-century women MEPs for Italy
Democratic Party (Italy) MEPs
Politicians from Florence